Saint-Jean-de-Fos (Languedocien: Sant Joan de Fòrcs) is a commune in the Hérault department in the Occitanie region in southern France.

Population

See also
Communes of the Hérault department
 Pont du Diable, Hérault

References

Communes of Hérault